Ernst Thomas Ferand (b. 1887; d. 29 May 1972) was a Hungarian music educator and musicologist. He was also known as Ernest Ferand and Ernst Ferand-Freund.

Biography

Ferand was born in 1887 in Budapest, Hungary. He became interested in the methods of Émile Jaques-Dalcroze, and from 1925-1938 he taught at Dalcroze's Schule Hellerau-Laxenburg. In 1938 he published the influential treatise Die Improvisation in der Musik (Improvisation in Music).

From 1939 until 1965 he was affiliated with the New School of Social Research. He wrote a number of articles which were published in The Musical Quarterly and the Journal of the American Musicological Society. Reviewing the English translation of Improvisation in Nine Centuries of Western Music, Peter Wishart described Ferand as "perhaps the most widely acknowledged authority on the subject [of improvisation in Western music.]"

Ferand died on May 29, 1972 in Basel, Switzerland.

Bibliography

Books

 (1938). Die Improvisation in der Musik: eine entwicklungsgeschichtliche und psychologische Untersuchung. Zürich: Rhein-Verlag.
 (1956). Die Improvisation; in Beispielen aus neun Jahrhunderten abendländischer Musik (Improvisation in Nine Centuries of Western Music). Köln: A. Volk Verlag.
 (1957). "Improvisation", die Musik in Geschichte und Gegenwart (Encyclopedia) vol. 6, Kassel; Basel: Bärenreiter. pp. 1093-1135.
 (1961). Improvisation in nine centuries of western music; an anthology with a historical introduction. Köln: Arno Volk Verlag. Series: Das Musikwerk (Anthology of music), no. 12.

Articles

References

1887 births
1972 deaths
Hungarian music educators
Hungarian musicologists
20th-century musicologists